The 2018 Western Carolina Catamounts team represented Western Carolina University as a member of the Southern Conference (SoCon) during the 2018 NCAA Division I FCS football season. Led by seventh-year head coach Mark Speir, the Catamounts compiled an overall record of 3–8 with a mark of 1–7 in conference play, placing eighth in the SoCon. Western Carolina played their home games at Bob Waters Field at E. J. Whitmire Stadium in Cullowhee, North Carolina.

Previous season
The Catamounts finished the 2017 season 7–5, 5–3 in SoCon play to finish in fourth place.

Preseason

Award watch lists

Preseason media poll
The SoCon released their preseason media poll on July 25, 2018, with the Catamounts predicted to finish in fifth place. The same day the coaches released their preseason poll with the Catamounts predicted to finish in fourth place.

Preseason All-SoCon Teams
The Catamounts placed six players on the preseason all-SoCon teams.

Offense

1st team

Zach Weeks – OL

2nd team

Tyrie Adams – QB

Nathan Dalton – OL

Andrew Miles – OL

Defense

1st team

Marvin Tillman – DB

Specialists

1st team

Ian Berryman – P

Schedule

Game summaries

Newberry

at Gardner–Webb

VMI

at Furman

at Samford

Chattanooga

at Mercer

at East Tennessee State

The Citadel

Wofford

at North Carolina

References

Western Carolina
Western Carolina Catamounts football seasons
Western Carolina Catamounts football